Sitges is a town about 35 kilometres southwest of Barcelona, in Spain, renowned worldwide for its Film Festival, Carnival, and LGBT Culture. Located between the Garraf Massif and the Mediterranean Sea, it is known for its beaches, nightspots, and historical sites.

While the roots of Sitges' artistic reputation date back to the late 19th century, when painter Santiago Rusiñol took up residence there during the summer, the town became a centre for the 1960s counterculture in mainland Spain, in Francoist Spain, and became known as "Ibiza in miniature".

Today, the economy of Sitges is based on tourism and culture, offering more than 4,500 hotel beds, half of them in four-star hotels.

Sitges is a gay-friendly destination with many establishments catering for the LGBT community and popular gay beaches.

Almost 35% of the approximately 26,000 permanent inhabitants are from the Netherlands, the UK, France, and Scandinavia, whose children attend international schools in the area. There are 17 beaches. Sitges was also the site of the annual Bilderberg conference held in June 2010.

Sitges has been referred to as the Saint-Tropez of Spain, with property prices approaching those of the most expensive European cities, the main reason for this being the setting by the sea and the surrounding . Proximity to Barcelona-El Prat Airport is also a major advantage.

Toponymy 
The name of the town is simply the Catalan word sitges, plural of sitja, meaning silos in English.

See  for more individual name origins and details.

History
Human presence in the area dates to at least the Neolithic era, and an Iberian settlement from the 4th century. In the 1st century BC, it included two separated villages, later absorbed by the Romans.

During the Middle Ages, a castle was built in Sitges, owned by the bishopric of Barcelona, which later ceded it to count Mir Geribert (1041). In the 12th century, the town fell under the rule of the Sitges family. The latter held it until 1308, when Agnes of Sitges sold the town to Bernat de Fonollar, after whose death it went to the Pia Almoina, a charitable institution, to which it belonged until 1814.

Sitges economy was mostly based on the production of wine until the economic boom of the 1960s, after which it became a tourist resort.

In 1958, political leaders (Liberals and Conservatives) from the country of Colombia met in Sitges and signed a peace treaty, the "Declaration of Sitges", instituting a consociationalist democracy in Colombia and creating the National Front.

Geography 
The municipality of Sitges is located in the Garraf comarca. It is bordered to the north by the municipalities of Olivella and Begues, to the west by Sant Pere de Ribes and Villanova i la Geltrú, to the east by Gavá and Castelldefels, and to the south by the Mediterranean Sea.

Carnival
For over a century, Sitges has celebrated Carnestoltes, or Carnival, between the months of February and March, according to the liturgical calendar. The festivities begin on Dijous Gras, or Fat Thursday, with King Carnestoltes’ arrival. They continue until the burial of the sardine — late afternoon on Ash Wednesday.

Folk dances and xatonades (traditional local salad served with assorted omelets) are also characteristic carnival elements. The two most important moments are the Rua de la Disbauxa, or the Debauchery Parade, on Sunday night and the Rua de l'Extermini, or Extermination Parade, on Tuesday night. Around forty floats with more than 2,000 participants fill Sitges. Many people come from all around to see it, describing it as a favourite time of year because of the celebration.

Gastronomy
Xató is Sitges' most typical dish. Its first recorded mention is in local newspaper Eco de Sitges report on Fat Thursday, published on 16 February 1896. The report refers to a meal that three days before had gathered together a selected group of Catalan artists and intellectuals, including Santiago Rusiñol, Miquel Utrillo and Gaietà Buigas. The name "xató" comes from an expression pronounced years before by Canudas, a member of the Rusiñol's group.

Malvasia is a delicate liquor wine served in Sitges, primarily with dessert. The name "malvasia" comes from the Peloponnesian port Monemvasía.

Museums
 Cau Ferrat Museum
 Museu Romàntic Can Llopis
 Maricel Museum
 Fundació Stämpfli Contemporary Art

Beaches

Sitges has 17 sand beaches. Four of them are in the east: the first one called Les Botigues at the beginning of the coast, next to the beaches of Castelldefels and the other three are following the coast of Garraf (Road C-31). One of them is Garraf village beach.

There are eleven beaches in the town and two to its west, which are difficult to access.

All the eastern and urban beaches have flags indicating the state of the sea and most of them have quality diplomas and blue flags awarded by the European Union.

There are three main nudist beaches located in Sitges. One of which is Platja dels Balmins, the second nudist beach is Platja d'Aiguadolç, both of these beaches are populated by all members of the community. The third nudist beach is Playa del Muerto, which is more populated by the gay community. Platja dels Balmins and Platja d'Aiguadolç are located on the eastern side of Sitges while Playa del Muerto is located on the western side of Sitges and is more difficult to reach.

Education
There are six public Catalan primary schools in Sitges: Escola Agnès de Sitges, Escola Esteve Barrachina, Escola Maria Ossó, Escola Miquel Utrillo, Escola Pia Sitges, and the catholic Camp Joliu.

Private schools include the French Lycée Bel Air, and the English Richmond International and The Olive Tree School.

The British School of Barcelona (BSB) also operates a campus in Sitges, providing education for primary (3-11 years), located in the upscale neighbourhood of Vallpineda.

The Institute of the Arts Barcelona is an international leader in performing arts training and education collage based out of Terramar.

LGBT Culture 
Sitges is one of the world's top leaders in the protection and advocating for equal rights for the LGBT community. It is often described as the gay capital of Europe, particularly in peak season of the summer months of May to September.

With its spirit and vibrant urban atmosphere, Sitges has become one of the top gay holiday spots for LGBT tourists and is at the centre of gay European nightlife, including spas, shopping, and dining. A small but compact city, it contains a huge concentration of gay-friendly hotels, restaurants, shops, and over 20 gay bars. A city that sizzles with unconcealed hedonism yet manages to stay classy thanks to its art galleries, international-style architecture, gourmet dining, and upmarket hotels.

The key gay events are Carnival, Sitges Pride, Bears Week, Festa Major, and Circuit Barcelona.

Sister cities
  Bagnères-de-Luchon (France)

Motor racing
Sitges is part of the long history of motor racing in Catalonia. From 1908 to 1920, events were staged over public roads from Sitges to Canyelles to Vilanova i la Geltrú, and from Mataró to Vilassar de Mar and Argentona. Albert Divo won the only Spanish Grand Prix held at the banked Sitges Terramar driving a Sunbeam.

Notable residents
 Rafael Font Farran (1912–2003), politician and journalist
 Facundo Bacardí (1814–1886), businessman 
 Mir Geribert (died 1060), Catalan nobleman
 Santiago Rusiñol (1861–1931), artist
 Arcadi Mas i Fondevila (1852–1934), artist
 Christopher Small (1927–2011), musician and ethnomusicologist
 Miguel Condé (1939), painter

Gallery

See also
 Sitges Film Festival
 Sitges railway station

References

 Panareda Clopés, Josep Maria; Rios Calvet, Jaume; Rabella Vives, Josep Maria (1989). Guia de Catalunya, Barcelona: Caixa de Catalunya.  (Spanish).  (Catalan).

External links

 Official website of Sitges Council
 Government data pages 
 Sitges – The pride of Catalonia 
 https://en.wiktionary.org/wiki/sitges

 
Tourism in Spain
Seaside resorts in Spain
Mediterranean port cities and towns in Spain
Gay villages in Spain